Trevor Miller is an English screenwriter, author and playwright who the Record Mirror joked "is hailed by some as the voice of a generation". The London Evening Standard called his debut novel Trip City "an On the Road for the post warehouse party generation."  He has since moved to Los Angeles, where he writes film screenplays.

Plays
 Heart of Saturday Night
 The Flesh Trader

Bibliography
Trip City (1989),

Filmography
 Out of Reach (2004)
 Into the Sun (2005)
 Trip City (2010)
 Riot On Redchurch Street (2012)

References

External links
 
 

American male screenwriters
English science fiction writers
Writers from Manchester
Alumni of the University of Westminster
Living people
1965 births
British male novelists